In Greek mythology, Stratichus (Ancient Greek: Στράτιχος Strátikhos), also known as Stratius, was a prince of Pylos and the son of King Nestor and either Eurydice or Anaxibia. He was the brother to Thrasymedes, Pisidice, Polycaste, Perseus, Peisistratus, Aretus, Echephron and Antilochus. Stratichus appears in The Odyssey.

Notes

References 

 Apollodorus, The Library with an English Translation by Sir James George Frazer, F.B.A., F.R.S. in 2 Volumes, Cambridge, MA, Harvard University Press; London, William Heinemann Ltd. 1921. ISBN 0-674-99135-4. Online version at the Perseus Digital Library. Greek text available from the same website.
Homer, The Odyssey with an English Translation by A.T. Murray, Ph.D. in two volumes. Cambridge, MA., Harvard University Press; London, William Heinemann, Ltd. 1919. . Online version at the Perseus Digital Library. Greek text available from the same website.

Princes in Greek mythology
Characters in the Odyssey
Pylian characters in Greek mythology
Children of Nestor (mythology)